Finlandia University is a private Lutheran university in Hancock, Michigan. It is the only private university in the Upper Peninsula.  Founded in 1896 as The Suomi College and Theological Seminary, it is affiliated with the Evangelical Lutheran Church in America. The university is planning to close after the spring semester of 2023 due to enrollment and financial challenges.

History 
Finlandia University was founded as Suomi College on September 8, 1896, by J. K. Nikander (b. 1855, Hämeenlinna, Finland, d. 1919). During the 1880s, large numbers of Finns immigrated to Hancock, Michigan to labor in the copper and lumber industries. As a mission pastor of the Finnish Evangelical Lutheran Church of America headquartered in Hancock, Nikander observed that Swedish and Finnish immigrants along the Delaware River did not train new ministers, and he feared a loss of Finnish identity. The college's role was to preserve Finnish culture, train Lutheran ministers and teach English. During the 1920s, Suomi College became a liberal arts college and in 1958, the seminary separated from the college. On July 1, 2000, Suomi College changed its name to Finlandia University.

The cornerstone of Old Main, the first building erected at Suomi College, was laid on May 30, 1898. Jacobsville sandstone, quarried at the Portage Entry of the Keweenaw waterway, was brought by barge, cut, and used to construct the Old Main. Dedicated on January 21, 1900, it contained a dormitory, kitchen, laundry, classrooms, offices, library, chapel, and lounge. The burgeoning college quickly outgrew this building. In 1901 a frame structure, housing a gym, meeting hall, and music center, was erected on an adjacent lot. The frame building was demolished when Nikander Hall, named for Suomi's founder, was constructed in 1939. The hall was designed by the architectural firm of Eliel Saarinen and J. Robert F. Swanson. In addition to Old Main, the present day main campus consists of Nikander Hall, Mannerheim Hall, Wargelin Hall, Finlandia Hall, the Paavo Nurmi Center for Physical Education, the Kivi House, Hoover Center, the Finnish American Heritage Center, the Chapel of St. Matthew, and the Jutila Center.

Finlandia University has been a university of the Lutheran church since its inception. In 1988, the university became affiliated with the Evangelical Lutheran Church in America. The curriculum, campus events, and the community explore the value of faith, vocation, and service. Finlandia University is accredited by the Higher Learning Commission of the North Central Association for Colleges and Schools (NCA-HLC). In 1996, the university transitioned from a two-year college to a four-year university. Since the 2020–21 academic year, Finlandia's admissions policy contains no requirements for academic credentials other than secondary school transcripts, such as SAT or ACT scores.

A marker designating the college and its Old Main building as Michigan Historic Sites was erected by the Michigan Historical Commission in 1991. 

On October 6, 2021, the university's board of trustees formally accepted a letter from its 16th president, Rev. Dr. Philip R. Johnson, informing them of his intention to retire at the end of the 2021–22 academic term. On May 4, 2022, Finlandia announced Timothy Pinnow would become the next president effective July 1, 2022.

On March 2, 2023, Timothy Pinnow announced that Finlandia University would close after the spring 2023 semester. Pinnow cited a lack of interest in enrollment and the debt load of the university as factors in shutting down operations. The university has set up agreements for students to finish their education at Michigan Technological University, Bay de Noc Community College, Adrian College, and Wartburg College, with work on a fifth agreement with Northern Michigan University in progress. The university's board of trustees voted on March 14, 2023, to officially dissolve the university. Finlandia also announced that some staff had been laid off to free up funding for operations related to student transfers. They also announced that all other staff would be laid off following commencement.

Campus 
Finlandia University is located in Hancock, Michigan.  The town is located on the Keweenaw Peninsula in Michigan's Upper Peninsula. The Keweenaw Peninsula stretches north into Lake Superior.

Finnish-American Heritage Center 
Also part of Finlandia University, and serving both the campus and the community, is the Finnish American Heritage Center which hosts numerous university and community events and houses a museum, art gallery, and theater. The Finnish American Historical Archives are located here.

The Lions Den of North Wind Books offers an extensive collection of quality adult and children's fiction and nonfiction publications, and textbooks. It also sells Finnish functional design items for the home, and university logo merchandise.

Academics
Finlandia's most popular undergraduate majors, by 2021 graduates, were:
Registered Nursing/Registered Nurse (7)
Small Business Administration/Management (5)
Criminal Justice/Police Science (5)
Business Administration, Management and Operations (4)
Psychology (4)

Athletics 
There are 10 NCAA Division III athletic sports at Finlandia, whose teams are known as Lions, competing primarily as a member of the Coast to Coast Athletic Conference (C2C) since 2020. Women's athletics include: basketball, ice hockey, soccer, softball and volleyball. Men's athletics include baseball, basketball, football, ice hockey and soccer. Co-ed Esports were added as varsity-level sports in the 2020–2021 season.

Conference affiliation 
 Coast to Coast Athletic Conference: baseball, men's & women's basketball, men's & women's soccer, softball, volleyball
 Northern Collegiate Hockey Association: men's (since 2004) & women's (since 2003) ice hockey
 Upper Midwest Athletic Conference: football (since 2021)

Notable alumni 
Notable alumni of Finlandia University include:
 Trent Daavettila, ice hockey player
 Ryan Donovan, ice hockey player
 Sanna Kannasto, labor activist and feminist
 Medaria Arradondo, Police Chief of the Minneapolis Police Department
 John Raymond Ylitalo, 29th United States Ambassador to Paraguay

References

External links 

 
 Official Finlandia Lions athletics website

 
1896 establishments in Michigan
Buildings and structures in Houghton County, Michigan
Education in Houghton County, Michigan
Educational institutions established in 1896
Finnish-American culture in Michigan
Finnish-American history
Hancock, Michigan
Liberal arts colleges in Michigan
Private universities and colleges in Michigan